Marie Waife was an American writer best known for writing the 1968 biography, My Father, Sholem Aleichem, about the brilliant Yiddish author and playwright.

Biography
Marie Waife was born in Odessa, Russian Empire (now Ukraine), in 1892, as the fifth child of Sholem Aleichem and his wife Olga. She lived in various locations throughout Europe including Switzerland, Germany, and Italy due to financial insecurity until 1914, when she and her family migrated to the United States, residing in the Lower East Side of New York City.

She married the writer and journalist Benjamin Waife (known by his pen name Ben Zion Goldberg) in 1917 and had two sons: Sholom and Mitchell. In 1968, Waife published a biography of her father titled My Father, Sholem Aleichem, the first complete biography of the famous writer. She was known for holding meetings at her New York residence on the anniversary of Aleichem's death to read his works. Waife died in 1985 and was survived by her sons.

References

1892 births
1985 deaths
20th-century American women writers
Emigrants from the Russian Empire to the United States
Jewish women writers
Jewish writers
Odesa Jews
Writers from New York City